Edna Ida May Bessell  (née Tovey), born 1946, is a former international lawn bowler from England.

Bowls career
She won a bronze medal in the Triples with Barbara Till, Norma Shaw and Babs Barlow at the 1992 World Outdoor Bowls Championship. Barlow was the English president had stepped in to replace the injured Norma Shaw. She also won a second bronze in the fours with Jean Baker, Till and Mary Price.

In 1993 she won the triples silver medal and fours bronze medal at the inaugural Atlantic Bowls Championships.

In 2005 she won the fours gold medal and pairs bronze medal at the Atlantic Championships and in 2009 she won the pairs silver medal at the Atlantic Bowls Championships.

Bessell also won four national singles titles representing Somerset. She later became team manager for England's women and was appointed MBE.

References

English female bowls players
Members of the Order of the British Empire
1946 births
Living people